

About the Award

The Community Service Award is presented to a group or an individual who have a history of giving back to the community.

References

External links
 NAACP Theatre Awards

African-American theatre
NAACP Theatre Awards
Awards established in 1991
1991 establishments in the United States